Yevhen Ivanovych Drahunov (13 February 1964 – 10 September 2001) was a Ukrainian professional football player.

Club career
He made his professional debut in the Soviet Second League in 1984 for SKA Kyiv.

In 1983 Drahunov took part in the Summer Spartakiad of the Peoples of the USSR in the team of Ukrainian SSR.

Death
In 2001 Drahunov died from a stroke.

Honours
 Soviet Cup finalist: 1986.

References

External links
 Database of players participating in UPL 

1964 births
Sportspeople from Makiivka
2001 deaths
Soviet footballers
Ukrainian footballers
Ukraine international footballers
SKA Kiev players
FC Shakhtar Donetsk players
FC Shakhtar Pavlohrad players
SC Tavriya Simferopol players
FC Lada-Tolyatti players
FC Kuban Krasnodar players
FC Shinnik Yaroslavl players
FC Lada Chernivtsi players
FC Rot-Weiß Erfurt players
FC Zorya Luhansk players
Soviet Top League players
Ukrainian Premier League players
Russian Premier League players
Ukrainian expatriate footballers
Expatriate footballers in Russia
Expatriate footballers in Germany
Ukrainian expatriate sportspeople in Russia
Ukrainian expatriate sportspeople in Germany
Association football defenders